Battlestar Galactica: Blood & Chrome is a prequel to the reimagined Battlestar Galactica series and is the latest installment in the franchise. It was a web-series that became a pilot for a possible series chronicling the early adventures of a young William Adama, but the series was not picked up. It stars Luke Pasqualino, Ben Cotton, and Lili Bordán. Michael Taylor wrote the teleplay from a story by Taylor, David Eick, Bradley Thompson and David Weddle, with Jonas Pate as director.

Setting
Set in the tenth year of the First Cylon War, the story follows William Adama, a young pilot just graduated from the Academy, assigned to one of the battlestars in the Colonial fleet: the Galactica. The series provides a very basic frame of reference to the events that ensued in the time between the prequel series Caprica, and the basis series Battlestar Galactica.

Cast
 Luke Pasqualino as Ensign/Lieutenant William "Husker" Adama
 Ben Cotton as Lieutenant "Coker" Fasjovik. Cotton previously portrayed a captured Colonial awaiting Cylon experimentation in Battlestar Galactica: Razor.
 Lili Bordán as Dr. Becca Kelly
 John Pyper-Ferguson as Tech Sergeant Xander Toth; Pyper-Ferguson previously played recurring character Tomas Vergis on Caprica, and Pegasus CAG Captain Taylor on Battlestar Galactica.
 Zak Santiago as Captain Armin "High Top" Diaz; Santiago previously played supporting character Pan on Caprica.
 Leo Li Chiang as Osirus Marine Sergeant
 Mike Dopud as Captain Deke "Minute Man" Tornvald; Dopud previously played supporting character Specialist Gage on Battlestar Galactica.
 Brian Markinson as Commander Silas Nash; Markinson played supporting character Jordan Duram on Caprica.
 Adrian Holmes as Lieutenant Decklan Elias
 Karen LeBlanc as Lieutenant Jenna
 Carmen Moore as Senior Lieutenant Nina Leotie; Moore played supporting character Fidelia Fazekas on Caprica.
 Toby Levins as Pilot "Sandman"
 Jill Teed as Commander Ozar; Teed portrayed the role of MSgt. Hadrian on Battlestar Galactica and supporting character Colonel Sasha Patel on Caprica.
 Sebastian Spence as Lieutenant Jim "Sunshine" Kirby; Spence played Capt. Noel "Narcho" Allison on Battlestar Galactica.
 Jordan Weller as Seamus Fahey
 Tom Stevens as Marine Baris
 Tricia Helfer as humanoid Cylon Prototype (voice); Helfer played the Cylon model Number Six in Battlestar Galactica.
 Ty Olsson as Osiris Crewmember; Olsson portrayed LSO Captain Aaron Kelly on Battlestar Galactica.

Development
On July 27, 2010, executive producer Michael Taylor shared information about the project, establishing that it would be filmed using digital reconstructions of the Battlestar Galactica sets that were scanned before they were dismantled after the end of the show.

Syfy made an announcement on October 22, 2010, saying that a two-hour pilot was green-lit for production. On February 10, 2011, Battlestar Galactica: Blood & Chrome began principal photography in Vancouver, British Columbia. During the 2011 San Diego Comic-Con, Syfy's president of original programming, Mark Stern, hinted to an uncertainty regarding which format the project was going to be released in, weighing the possibility of making it into an online series. On February 18, 2012, Battlestar Galactica and Caprica composer Bear McCreary confirmed that he had finished scoring the two-hour pilot.

On March 21, 2012, Deadline Hollywood confirmed that Battlestar Galactica: Blood & Chrome would not move forward in TV format but was still regarded as a candidate for a digital series. On July 12, 2012 however, an article written on the San Diego Comic Con Battlestar Panel stated that Richard Hatch and Jane Espenson were convinced that "Blood and Chrome was still on the table as a series for SyFy", and that "Bryan Singer's BSG movie is on track". Following the release of an official trailer, Battlestar Galactica: Blood & Chrome was scheduled for release on November 9, 2012, as an online series consisting of ten 12-minute acts.

Episodes

Release

Online
On March 20, 2012, a demo reel was leaked online, gathering well over 100,000 views in 24 hours. However, NBCUniversal ordered it to be removed, saying it was not an official trailer. On November 5, 2012, an official trailer was released, pointing to an official release date on November 9, 2012.

On November 9, 2012 the Machinima network released the first two episodes of Blood and Chrome on its YouTube channel. It released two additional episodes each Friday, until the finale on December 7, 2012. They have since been removed with the release on DVD and Blu-ray.

Broadcast
Universal Cable Productions stated that Blood & Chrome would be broadcast as a movie on SyFy following the online release. It aired February 10, 2013. It garnered 1.145 million viewers with a 0.31 adults 18-49 rating.

In Canada Space (TV channel) later aired the film.

Home media
Battlestar Galactica: Blood & Chrome was released on Blu-ray, DVD, On Demand and Digital Download on February 19, 2013.

References

External links 
 
 Battlestar Galactica: Blood & Chrome at the Battlestar Wiki

2012 web series debuts
2012 web series endings
Battlestar Galactica
Television films as pilots
Syfy original films
American science fiction web series
Television prequel films
Space opera web series
Films directed by Jonas Pate
American prequel films